Andrija Maurović (29 March 1901 – 2 September 1981) was a renowned comic book author, often called the father of Croatian and Yugoslav comics. He is mostly known for his Stari Mačak (Old Mickey, Old Cat) series, published mostly during the 30s, eventually becoming a nickname for the author himself.

He was born in Muo near Kotor in the Kingdom of Dalmatia (today in Montenegro) to a family of mixed background, eventually enrolling at the Academy of Fine Arts in Zagreb and subsequently pursuing his career as an illustrator and comic book creator for the local publications. Together with other writers and artists, he founded the comics magazine "Mickey Strip" in 1937, where much of his work was serialized. He is known for his realistic, rough style, utilizing black and white contrasts and dynamic flow through the use of perspectives.

Biography
Maurović was born in the village of Muo (part of Kotor) in Boka Kotorska in present-day Montenegro (at the time in Austria-Hungary)  to a Slovene father (spelled Maurowitch)). and a mother Croat from Boka Kotorska (now in Montenegro). After a short stay in Kraków, Poland, he moved with his family to the nearby city of Dubrovnik where he attended elementary and secondary school.

Following the recommendation of the writer Ivo Vojnović, he enrolled at the Academy of Arts in Zagreb. Soon he got into conflicts regarding norms and rules because the academy prevented students from working during their studies. At that time he started illustrating books, weekly and daily newspapers, and working for  graphic institutions, booksellers and editors, particularly for St. Kugli. As one of the best students, particularly in drawing, he dropped his first academic year. Being extremely busy with the work he liked, he took his academic troubles lightly. Working on illustrations, caricatures, posters and graphic design, he became one of the best, and his work appeared in the editions of papers and magazines like Jutarnji list, Novosti, Koprive, Ženski svijet, Kulisa.

In 1935, he created his first comic Vjerenica Mača, which was published in the Zagreb newspaper Novosti. In the same year Maurović co-launched Oko, the first Yugoslav comics magazine.

Maurović collaborated with many eminent Croatian writers and screenplay writers, such as Franjo Fuis. He also drew his illustrations based on literary models of classic world writers and novelists like Alex Tolstoy, Zane Grey, August Šenoa, Jack London, B. Traven, Max Brand, and H. G. Wells.

It is difficult to describe the total number of his professions and activities. Maurović was recognized as a successful designer of posters within socialist realism production at a time when poster propaganda was much more important than today. He was a painter of seascapes and apocalyptic scenes, caricaturist, illustrator, preacher and comic strip sketcher. At a time when there was no pornography in any medium, Maurović published a series of drawings alluding to extramarital and marital relations. He lived a life of his own creation and created a great number of impressive comic strip heroes and personalities (like Dan, Old Tom-cat, Radoslav). His works are part of the Sudac Collection.

Being in all the world encyclopaedias and publications on comics, he has earned his eminent place in the art of world comics. Numerous editions and reprints of his best works, numerous awards and prizes he has received, the reputation that he achieved is comparable with the achievements and fame of the greatest names and creators of cartoons in the world.

In the 1960s, a redesigned version of the Dubrovnik chess set by Andrija Maurović was created and produced in the workshop of master craftsman Jakopović in Zagreb. The most obvious changes in the redesign can be observed in the knights with simplified carving and the queens had only five cuts in the crown as opposed to the original eleven.  Bobby Fischer was often filmed and photographed with his own 1970 Dubrovnik chess set that was later stolen.

Towards the end of his life he "gave up working on mainstream comics and turned to an ascetic lifestyle that excluded the luxuries of running water and electricity, painting huge oil paintings with apocalyptic motifs and hardcore porn comics for his own pleasure". For Maurović, candaulism was said to be “not an individual excess but an obsession that preoccupies all his pornographic comics. Only the men to which the husband exposes his wife differ- but it is desirable that they should be as ugly, wild, dirty, proscribed, and socially unacceptable as possible, to make the transgression even greater and the humiliation even more powerful. In order to emphasize all the more the power of the sexual instinct that drives the actors and crushes prohibition.”

Andrija Maurović died in Zagreb, and was buried in the Mirogoj cemetery. Although it may not be possible to fully reconstruct Maurović's political beliefs, his basic attitude is considered identical with that of his comics heroes, and this is the victory of justice and freedom.

Stari Mačak
Maurović began his best known series centered around the eponymous character Stari Mačak (Old Tom-cat) in 1937. The series together with its characters were created in collaboration with journalist Franjo Fuis, who detested adaptations, opting instead for an original series. The character "Stari Mačak" was first introduced in Gospodar Zlatnih Bregova (Master of the Golden Hills, January, 1937) as an elderly wanderer who lost his memories after a tragic accident. The work was first serialized in magazine "Novosti", and subsequently in comics magazine "Mickey Strip" under the name Crni Jahač (Dark Rider, 1938). He is not a typical Western hero, as Maurović sought inspiration from his daily acquaintances, basing Stari Mačak on a construction worker he frequently met at a pub in Ilica street.

This was quickly followed by Sablast Zelenih Močvara (Spook of The Green Swamps), where Stari Mačak was joined by wandering poet Polagana Smrt (Slow Death), along with his parrot Penelope and his horse Tulip. Posljednja pustolovina Starog Mačka (Old cat's last adventure), was published in volumes from November 1 until December 27 of 1937.

Legacy
Comic book historians Zdravko Zupan and Slavko Draginčić lauded Maurović for his masterful ability to develop visual dynamics, with particular emphasis on black and white contrasting. Art historian Vera Horvat Pintarić wrote about his interwar period comic book work:

Timothy O. Benson described him as a superb master of the art of cartoon, stating that "intensified interest in mass communications have resulted in reconsideration of his entire oeuvre". Maurović ignored global trends of comics in the 30s, creating his own distinct style and utilizing a great variety of themes for his opus. This involved both the use of monochromatic sfumato and playing with perspectives and scenes. It is for these reasons he is generally considered to be the father of comic books and illustration on the territories of the former Yugoslavia, and its most popular author.

Goran Sudžuka cited him as his main influence, praising him as "A truly unique figure in the whole comic industry, not just in Croatia.". The comic strip club in Kotor bears his name.

Bibliography 

Starting with his first comic strip Bride of the Sword in 1935, in a relatively short time (1935–1940) he drew a great number of comics, including:
 Empress of the Netherworld
 Mistress from Mars (after Alex Tolstoy)
 Three Men in the Dark (after Max Brand)
 The Seventh Victim (after Max Brand)
 The Black Rider 
 Plague's Ship
 Master of the Golden Hills
 Ghost of the Green Swamps
 With Fire and Sword (after Henryk Sienkiewicz)
 Goldsmith's Gold (Zlatarevo zlato), based on literary work of August Šenoa
 The Gold (after Jack London)
 Gunka Das (after Rudyard Kipling)

Their dramaturgy and morphology show a visible influence of the first westerns.

At the time of the Second World War his drawings included:
 The Tomb in the Rainforest
 The Great Migration of the Croats
 Prince Radoslav
 Ahura Mazda on the Nile (after Georg Ebers)
 Golden Island (after Robert Louis Stevenson)
 Tomislav

and after the war followed:
 The Mexican (after Jack London)
 The Siege
 The Lone Star Rider (after Zane Grey)
 Riders of The Purple Sage (after Zane Grey)
 Uglomi, the Master of the Cave (after H. G. Wells)
 The Pearl of Evil
 The Girl from Sierra
 The Old Tom-cat's Return
 The Old Tom-cat
 The Witch of Grič (after Marija Jurić Zagorka)
 Beware the Hand from Senj, (Čuvaj se senjske ruke), based on literary work of August Šenoa

References

External links

 Andrija Maurović - in English
 DUBROVNIK 1950 - maple & walnut - chess pieces

1901 births
1981 deaths
People from Kotor
People from the Kingdom of Dalmatia
Croatian comics artists
Croatian illustrators
20th-century Croatian people
Burials at Mirogoj Cemetery
Croats of Montenegro